Triisopropyl silane (TIPS) is an organosilicon compound with the formula (i-Pr)3SiH (i-Pr = isopropyl).  This colorless liquid is used as a scavenger in peptide synthesis. It can also act as a mild reducing agent.

In peptide synthesis, TIPS is used as a scavenger for peptide groups being removed from the peptide sequence at the global deprotection. TIPS is able to scavenge carbocations formed in the deprotection of a peptide as it can act as a hydride donor in acidic conditions. Silanes may be preferred as scavengers in place of sulfur-based scavengers.

References

Reducing agents
Silanes
Isopropyl compounds